El Fenix is a popular chain of Mexican restaurants in the Dallas/Ft. Worth Metroplex, (Texas) and the oldest chain of Mexican restaurants in the U.S.  The name is Spanish for "the phoenix", the legendary bird which, according to mythology, arose from its own ashes. The chain has its headquarters in Dallas.

It was founded in 1918 by Miguel (Mike) Martinez, and then sold on May 30, 2008 to an investment company.  Often, at its main location in downtown Dallas, the lunchtime line of patrons spills out the front door and down Alamo Street.  El Fenix is known for its brand of "Tex-Mex cuisine" and the Wednesday “Enchilada Dinner Special,” which features two cheese enchiladas, refried beans, and rice.

According to Alfred Martinez (son of Mike Martinez), the downtown location serves about 1,200 lunches on a typical Wednesday or Friday and about that many more for dinner.
After 90 years of ownership by the Martinez family, it was announced on June 5, 2008 that the family would sell the company to Dallas-based Firebird Restaurant Group LLC.

History
Originally Mike Martinez owned Martinez Café; most of its dishes were American cuisine. It was converted into El Fenix on September 15, 1918. The name was chosen since a phoenix signifies a rebirth. The original restaurant was in Downtown Dallas.

In the 1960s the original restaurant closed. In 1965 the original restaurant re-opened across the street at 1601 McKinney Avenue. In 2008 the Martinez family sold the chain to Firebird Restaurant Group LLC. The Martinez family used the code name Firebird when selling the chain. Firebird president Mike Karns paid the Martinez family over $30 million in cash; this was the family's asking price. At the time the annual sales were $33 million and there were 15 restaurants.

In 2011 there were 20 El Fenix restaurants in Texas. By 2014, the number of El Fenix restaurants had increased to 22 restaurants, and an El Fenix had opened at the WinStar World Casino in Oklahoma. Karnes expected that the annual sales in 2014 would be at least $50 million. That year, Karnes stated that he planned to expand the chain in Oklahoma, East Texas, and West Texas.

Corporate headquarters
The parent company of El Fenix is headquartered in Uptown Dallas. It announced its plans to acquire this building in 2012.

Previously El Fenix had its headquarters in the 11075 Harry Hines Boulevard building, which had  of space. In 2011 El Fenix Corp. announced that the former headquarters were for sale. The individuals marketing the former El Fenix building were Mark Miller of NAI Robert Lynn, Jim Svidron, and James Collins. In 2013, Tweaker Energy Drinks purchased the former El Fenix headquarters.

Locations
As of March 13, 2018 there are 22 North Texas locations:

Dallas locations
Downtown Dallas (original location)
Casa Linda
Oak Cliff
Oak Lawn (Lemmon @ Inwood)
North Dallas (Northwest Highway @ Hillcrest)
Lake Highlands (Skillman @ Audelia)
Northwest Dallas (Forest @ Webb Chapel)

Suburban locations
Addison
Arlington 
Burleson
Denton 
Fort Worth (Camp Bowie area)
Grapevine
Irving (183 & Airport Freeway)
Lewisville
McKinney
Mesquite
Plano
Waxahachie
Weatherford
Wichita Falls
In addition the chain operates a store inside Winstar World Casino.

See also

 History of Mexican Americans in Dallas-Fort Worth

References

External links
 El Fenix

Companies based in Dallas
Restaurants in Dallas
Mexican restaurants in Texas
Restaurants established in 1918